Larry Sonsini (born c. 1941) is an American lawyer specializing all aspects of corporate law. He is senior partner and founder of Wilson Sonsini Goodrich & Rosati, a law firm in business and intellectual property law. Sonsini has been described by Fortune as "the most influential and well-connected lawyer in the industry."

Sonsini studied law at the University of California, Berkeley School of Law where he graduated and received his J.D. degree from in 1966. He also received his B.A. degree in political science from the University of California, Berkeley in 1963.

Sonsini started out counseling semiconductor companies including Cypress Semiconductor, National Semiconductor and LSI Logic. He later counseled hardware firms such as Sun Microsystems, Apple Computer, Silicon Graphics and Seagate Technology and software companies such as Novell, Sybase, WordPerfect and VMware.  He has also worked for Google, Netscape and YouTube.  He has served as an advisor to many of the key figures in Silicon Valley history, including Steve Jobs, and the principals of Google and Hewlett-Packard.

Sonsini was recognized for his commitment to education in Silicon Valley at the Silicon Valley Education Foundation's September 2012 Pioneers & Purpose event. He was honored with the Pioneer Business Leader Award, which is awarded to individuals who have achieved outstanding accomplishments in business and education.

His son Pete Sonsini joined venture capital firm New Enterprise Associates in 2005, and now is a general partner of the firm and head of its enterprise practice group. Another son Matthew W. Sonsini is married to Lisa Sobrato Sonsini, daughter of billionaire real estate developer John A. Sobrato.

Sonsini became chair of the board of trustees for Santa Clara University in 2021.

References

1941 births
Living people
People from Rome, New York
UC Berkeley School of Law alumni
California lawyers
American law firm executives